254th may refer to:

254th (City of London) Regiment, Royal Artillery, volunteer field artillery unit of the British Army between 1863 and 1971
254th Battalion (Quinte's Own), CEF, unit in the Canadian Expeditionary Force during the First World War
254th Combat Communications Group (254 CCG) a unit of the Texas Air National Guard located at Hensley Field, Dallas, Texas
254th Fighter Aviation Regiment, aviation regiment established in 1944 as 1st Yugoslav Fighter Regiment
254th Indian Tank Brigade, armoured brigade of the Indian Army during World War II
254 (East of England) Medical Regiment, Royal Army Medical Corps, regiment of the British Army Reserve
254th Motor Rifle Division, motorized infantry division of the Soviet Army during the Cold War and later the Ukrainian Army
254th pope or Pope Gregory XVI (1765–1846), born Bartolomeo Alberto Cappellari, became pope on 2 February 1831
254th Tunnelling Company, one of the tunnelling companies of the Royal Engineers created by the British Army during World War I
Riverdale-West 254th Street station, commuter rail stop on the Metro-North Railroad's Hudson Line

See also
254 (number)
254, the year 254 (CCLIV) of the Julian calendar
254 BC